Veinticinco de Agosto, mostly written 25 de Agosto, is a small town in the Florida Department of central Uruguay.

Geography
The railroad track from Montevideo splits here in two tracks, one towards Salto and one towards Florida, the capital of the department.

The river Río Santa Lucía flows along the east limits of the village.

History
It was recognized as a recently created populated centre by a decree of 1 September 1875 and on 29 April 1912, it was declared a "Pueblo" (village) by the Act of Ley Nº 3.965. Its status was elevated to "Villa" (town) by the Act of Ley Nº 12.297 on 5 July 1956.

Population
In 2011, Veinticinco de Agosto had a population of 1,849.
 
Source: Instituto Nacional de Estadística de Uruguay

Places of worship
 Parish Church of the Saints Cosmas and Damian (Roman Catholic)

References

External links

INE map of Veinticinco de Agosto

Populated places in the Florida Department